Invited People (초대받은 성웅들 - 초대받은 사람들 - Chodaebadeun seongungdeul or Chodaebadeun saramdeul) is a 1981 South Korean film directed by Choi Ha-won. It was chosen as Best Film at the Grand Bell Awards.

Plot 

A religious drama about people studying and practising Catholicism in Korea during the mid 19th century despite oppression and persecution.

Cast 

 
 Yu In-chon
 Kim Seong-su
 Yoon Yang-ha
 Kim Min-kyoung
 Kwak Eun-kyung
 Oh Young-hwa
 Kim Ae-kyung
 Moon Mi-bong
 Yoon Il-ju
 Lee In-ock

Bibliography

Notes

1981 films
1980s Korean-language films
South Korean drama films
Best Picture Grand Bell Award winners
Films directed by Choi Ha-won